Anacyndaraxes was the father of Sardanapalus, king of Assyria.

Notes

Hellenistic historiography